The Global Confessional & Missional Lutheran Forum (Global Forum) is a global gathering of national and regional Lutheran churches. The forum was founded in Dallas, Texas by invitation of the North American Lutheran Church in 2015 to bring together Confessional Lutheran bodies who wish to emphasize missional discipleship as the focal point of ministry in the world. The gathering can be seen as an alternative to the more liberal Lutheran World Federation and to the more conservative International Lutheran Council and Confessional Evangelical Lutheran Conference.

In 2018, the Global Forum was hosted in Bishoftu, Ethiopia by the Ethiopian Evangelical Church Mekane Yesus. 43 leaders representing Lutheran bodies and organizations in 15 nations participated.

Members & Signatories

Sorted by country in alphabetical order

 Bolivia
Christian Evangelical Lutheran Church of Bolivia
 Canada
Lutheran CORE
North American Lutheran Church
World Mission Prayer League
 Denmark
Evangelical Lutheran Network
Danish Bible Institute
Lutheran Mission
 Ethiopia
Ethiopian Evangelical Church Mekane Yesus
 Germany
Church Coalition for the Bible and Confession
International Christian Network
 India
Christu Suda Communications and Ministries
 Indonesia
Indonesian Lutheran Christian Church
 Kenya
Evangelical Lutheran Church in Kenya
 Mongolia
Mongolian Evangelical Lutheran Church
 Norway
Norwegian Lutheran Mission
Inner Mission Federation
NLA University College
 Peru
Evangelical Lutheran Church - Peru
 South Sudan
Lutheran Church of South Sudan
 Sweden
Mission Province
 Tanzania
Evangelical Lutheran Church in Tanzania
 United States of America
Lutheran CORE
North American Lutheran Church
World Mission Prayer League

See also

 List of Lutheran denominations
Porvoo Communion

References

External links
 

International bodies of Lutheran denominations
Christian organizations established in 2015
International bodies of Lutheran denominations (currently existing)